The Historic Centre of Trujillo is the main urban area and the most important center of development and unfolding in the Peruvian city of Trujillo located in La Libertad Region. The whole process of its original urban fabric is in elliptical shape surrounded by España Avenue that was built in the wake of the Wall of Trujillo. It houses the seat of city government and other important entities in the locality. In the center of this historic urban area is the Plaza de Armas of Trujillo that was the scene of the Spanish founded of the city in 1534 and the proclamation of the independence of Trujillo on December 29, 1820.

The historic centre of Trujillo contains numerous monuments dating from the Viceroyalty and Republican, was declared a Monumental City by municipal decree of April 23, 1971 and Monumental Area by Supreme Resolution No. 2900-72-ED of December 26, 1972, is also the largest urban center and characteristic of the city that maintains its dual status as historic centre and active center of the conglomerate metropolitan of Trujillo, according to the role that gives the Metropolitan Development Plan of Trujillo. The care and maintenance of the historic area of Trujillo is conducted by the Provincial Municipality of Trujillo, according to Law No. 23 853 of the Organic Law of Municipalities, which authorizes it to regulate, promote and ensure the conservation of Cultural Heritage of the city such as environments and historic buildings monuments.

The historic centre of Trujillo occupies approximately 133.5ha area and consists of a total of 1,783 lots, grouped in 72 blocks are located within the area that is also known as the "Enclosure of Trujillo" and originally was bounded by the wall of the city.

According to the census of 2005 the historic centre of Trujillo then had a population of about 12,000 inhabitants and is populated by various monuments including buildings predominate product of colonial and religious architecture prevailing during the viceroyalty era, as well as houses dating from the same era and the dawn of the republic whose hallmarks are its balconies and windows to fashion lace trellises.

Architecture

Urban fabric
Martín de Estete began the stroke of the city of Trujillo on behalf of Diego de Almagro in December 1534. The original urban fabric of the historic centre of Trujillo has an elliptical structure formed by the España Avenue, in this structure the streets are wide and straight, and are arranged in a checkerboard that part of the Plaza de Armas of the city. Besides the urban area surrounded by España Avenue is also part of the monumental area of the historic centre the area comprising the Mansiche sports complex, the former railway station of Trujillo as well as the area occupied by the bullring in the city and areas of the parts that still remain of the Old Wall of Trujillo.

Ways of the historic centre

 España avenue
It was built in the wake of the historic Wall of Trujillo that protected the city and it was built in the 17th century, still remain historically valuable parts of the architecture of this wall that was demolished to make way for the expansive growth of the city of Trujillo. The avenue España is a city ring road allowing the transit of large numbers of vehicles; this avenue is the main reference of the geographical boundary of much of the historic centre with the extended portion of the city.
 Avenue Mansiche, this road is an extension of the jirón Orbegoso from Avenue España along Mansiche sports complex and the alameda of the same name. Drive through some 12 km to the legendary resort of Huanchaco to the northwest of the city.
 Avenue Manuel Vera Enríquez, only belongs to the monumental area of the historic centre the section between Avenue España and Avenue Gerónimo de la Torre.
 Avenue Gerónimo de La Torre, is located between the avenues Mansiche and Manuel Vera Enríquez and defines one side of the Mansiche sports complex.
 Jirón Francisco Pizarro, is one of the highest traffic routes in the historic centre of Trujillo, to northeast continues Avenue España passing in the Rímac street then splicing with Avenue Santa; to southwest abuts directly with the Avenue Larco which extends to the Pacific Ocean in the Resort of Buenos Aires.
 Jirón Diego de Almagro, is one of four roads that form the Plaza de Armas of Trujillo in the corner of the intersection of this with the jirón Pizarro is the Palace of the City Government.
 Jirón Independencia
 Jirón Mariscal Orbegoso
 Jirón San Martín
 Jirón Zepita
 Jirón Simón Bolívar
 Jirón Miguel Grau
 Jirón Agustín Gamarra
 Jirón Alfonso Ugarte
 Jirón Francisco Bolognesi
 Jirón Colón
 Jirón Martín Estete
 Jirón Junín
 Pasaje Armas
 Pasaje San Agustín
 Pasaje Extremadura
 Pasaje Santa Rosa
 Pasaje Blanco
 Pasaje San Luis
 Pasaje C
 Pasaje D
 Pasaje E
 Pasaje F, the pasaje F, like pasajes C, D, E, is located in block 5 of the jirón Zepita.
 Paseo Pizarro
It is located on the main street of the historic centre of Trujillo, the Jirón Pizarro in blocks 5,6,7 and 8 becomes exclusively a pedestrian and joins the Plaza de Armas with the Plazuela El Recreo, along its four blocks are numerous landmarks like the Palace Iturregui, the Emancipation House, etc. and businesses such as supermarkets, souvenir shops, cafes and bars, etc. In this jirón of Trujillo's historic centre are also major banks and private and state institutions in the region as the office of the Ombudsman in block 3 and the Reserve Central Bank branch in block 4, among others.

Balconies and windows

In the historic centre of Trujillo are characteristic of the architecture the typical balconies and barred windows that look buildings like viceroyalty mansions, city hall, etc.

Historic sites and monuments

The historic city centre is full of various monuments predominating buildings product of colonial and religious architecture prevailing during the viceroyalty era, as well as mansions dating from the same era and the beginning of the republic whose hallmarks are balconies and windows to fashion lace trellises. Among the major historical sites and monuments are the following:

Plaza de Armas

The Plaza de Armas of Trujillo or Plaza Mayor of Trujillo, is the foundation of the city of Trujillo. It is the principal historic public space of the city. All around are the buildings of the Palace of the City Government, the Cathedral of Trujillo, the Archbishop of Trujillo, harmonious viceroyalty and republican mansions etc. The Plaza de Armas is surrounded by the jirón Pizarro, jirón Independencia, the jirón Orbegoso and the jirón Almagro. In the center stands the Freedom Monument, which represents the country's independence process and "as commentators represents the most precious of human beings, love of freedom, the recall and recognition to the distinguished men we got independence". The statue was a work in Germany, materials used are marble and copper, the sculptor was Edmund Moeller.

The Freedom Monument

Located in the center of the Plaza de Armas of Trujillo and is work by sculptor Edmund Moeller and consists of three sections: the first is on a circular platform with pedestals, resting on a granite base, supporting the sculptures representing the art, the science, the trade and the health. The second consists of three robust statues. A statue of a man that snorts, the same that is crouched, symbolizing the oppression or slavery. A second statue's arms back, symbolizing the struggle for freedom. The third statue is a man with arms raised and hands doing fist, symbolizing the liberation. Also in this body are follows plaques: one commemorating the proclamation of independence of Trujillo, by José Bernardo de Torre Tagle, on December 29, 1820. The second plaque commemorates the Battle of Junín and the third plaque commemorating the Battle of Ayacucho.

Churches and monasteries

[[File:IglesiaLamerced.jpg|thumb|Church La Merced, located next to the headquarters of the Superior Court of Justice of La Libertad in the Paseo Pizarro]]

The Historic Centre of Trujillo hosts Catholic churches built in the viceroyalty era.
 1: The Cathedral of Trujillo:

Built between 1647 and 1666, its altars are Baroque and Rococo, its paintings belong to the Cuzco Paint School and the Quito School. The cathedral has the Cathedral Museum mainly religious works of the viceroyalty era in gold and silver. It is located in the Plaza de Armas of Trujillo in Orbegoso street.
 2: Church and Monastery El Carmen: this church noted for the harmony of its architecture was built in the 18th century. Of interest are its various altars and the wooden pulpit. It has about 150 paintings part of them from the Quito School of the 17th and 18th centuries. It also has a painting called "The Last Supper" of Otto van Veen who was master of the Flemish artist Peter Paul Rubens. Significantly, the painstaking work of carving covered with "gold leaf". Located in a corner between Bolívar and Colón streets.
 3: Church La Merced: this church dates back to the 17th century, whose design and construction is the Portuguese citizen Alonso de las Nieves, has a mixture of architectural styles in its facade. Interesting is his rococo organ. It is located next to the headquarters of the Superior Court of Justice of La Libertad in the 5th block of Paseo Pizarro.
 4: Church San Agustín: this church was built in the 16th and 17th centuries with a baroque altar. Particularly noteworthy are the murals depicting the apostles and the colonial pulpit of carved and gilded wood. Located on the 5th block of Jirón Bolívar against Orbegoso House.
 5: Church San Francisco: in the church are interesting in the aisles and the paintings of some characters of the scriptures and saints. Its main altar is adorned with colorful altarpieces and its pulpit dating from the 17th century. In the convent is the traditional local San Juan National College where it taught the poet César Vallejo. Located in a corner between Independencia and Gamarra streets.
 6: Church San Lorenzo: built in the 18th century, it has a rococo altarpiece richly decorated with gold, with golden and broquelado techniques, also has a recumbent Christ of invaluable bill. The church is Churrigueresque, characterized by twisted columns and ornate decoration. Located on a corner of jirones Ayacucho and Colón.
 7: Church Belén, built between 1710 and 1720, is home to a wonderful piece of stone sculpture of the Holy Family. It is in a corner at the intersection of jirones Almagro and Ayacucho. It used to be known as the church of the Sagrado Corazón.
 8: Church Santa Rosa, built between 1715 and 1717, is located on the corner of jirones San Martín and Estete. It is the testimony of thanks to divine providence of Don Francisco Risco. In it, it can see the decorated friezes of ancient and new interiors the majesty of colonial art.
 9: Church and Monastery Santa Clara: this church exhibits exterior architecture of the early 19th century. The interior houses three altarpieces and pulpits of superb craftsmanship and four polychrome reliefs decorate the paintings and spandrels. It is located at the intersection of jirones Independence and Junín.
 10: Church Santa Ana: this church contains Baroque paintings and sculptures very valuable, the architecture of this church has a resemblance to the churches of Mansiche and Huamán. This church is located in a corner formed by jirones Orbegoso and Zepita.
 11: Church de Santo Domingo: built between 1638 and 1642 highlighted its twin towers, on a wide volumetry in landscape design somewhat. With notable altarpiece of the main altar and the Virgin of the Rosary, and a greater crypt decorated with colorful murals. It is located in a corner between jirones Pizarro and Bolognesi.
 12: Church de la Compañía de Jesús: this church was built between 1632 and 1633 and has an interesting harmonic architectural set of arches, vaults and domes, designed by master Jesuit Diego de la Puente. Located on the Plaza de Armas of Trujillo in a corner formed by the jirones Independencia and Almagro.

Colonial and republican houses

 Casona Tinoco or Casa del Mayorazgo de Facalá: built in the 16th century by the owners of the first sugar company of Facalá. There it designed the first flag of independence in 1820, is located in a corner formed by the jirón Pizarro and street Bolognesi. Its front door is located at Jr. Pizarro 314.
 Itúrregui Palace: one of the most luxurious mansions in the Historic Centre, held in gold leaf details, mirrors and period furniture, the Count Itúrregui built it with the greatest of luxuries for his wife and son, today is home of Club Central de Trujillo in block 6 of Paseo Pizarro.

 Casa Baanante: marked with Arabic influence, the house is an exquisite work of the Republican era, located in block 4 of Jirón Ayacucho in the historic centre, keeps Arabic influenced architecture in its wall tiles. The large hand carved wooden doors serve as entry into the first courtyard. It is also The house has two courtyards one larger than the other with fountains. This house is still owned by the Baanante family and is for sale. It is rented out for parties and events.
 Casa Calonge or Urquiaga: built in a neoclassical style, between the 18th and 19th centuries, Simón Bolívar stayed here. It can see the desk used by Bolívar, gold ornaments of the Chimú culture and its period furnishings. It is located in block 4 of Jirón Pizarro in the Plaza de Armas of Trujillo, is the headquarters in the city the Central Reserve Bank.
 Casa de la Emancipación  is considered the city's civic sanctuary, from here the mayor of Trujillo, the Marquis of Torre Tagle, leading an independence movement in 1820 proclaimed the independence of Peru. La Casa de la Emancipación served as headquarters of the first constituent congress and home of President José de la Riva Agüero. The historical monument retains a series of 18th-century watercolours and is located in one of the corner formed by Pizarro and Gamarra streets. It is an active centre for cultural activities ranging from art exhibitions, theater performances, to recitals and concerts.
 Casa Ganoza Chopitea: for its architecture, is one of the most representative mansions of Trujillo. It is known for the house of the cover of lions as its baroque facade is crowned by a rococo pediment and two lions. It is located in block 6 of Jirón Independencia.
 Casa del Mariscal de Orbegoso or Casa Orbegoso: this building was constructed between the 18th and 19th centuries of viceroyalty style. The house belonged to President Luis José de Orbegoso, Peruvian independence leader. The house retains many personal items of the quarterback, such as paintings, furniture, mirrors and silverware. Here it organize art-related exhibitions. Located on the 5th block of Jirón Orbegoso.
 Casa César Vallejo: in this house stayed the poet César Vallejo, presents a broad wooden balcony along most of its cover. It is located in a corner of streets Orbegoso and San Martín into the block 5 of the latter.
 La Casa Risco is located in a corner of streets Ayacucho and Junín, this mansion has been running along a series of owners in the time to Risco family, who sold it to the Banco de la Vivienda, an organization that restored the traditional building. Since 1995 it was transferred to the University of Trujillo to host the Museum of Archaeology of the city.
 Casa Bracamonte or Lizarzaburu: this house has simple neoclassical front; on the right shows a large window grille with hat gives a classic Trujillan look to the house; to the left has a window and box balcony with shutters. Inside the first courtyard shows a flagstone floor and is surrounded by a raised gallery, on which open the doors and windows of the rooms. It is located in block 4 of the jirón Independencia from the Plaza de Armas.
 Municipal Theatre of Trujillo: inaugurated in the late 19th century, the theatre is one of the most important venues of the city's cultural exposition, has three levels and private boxes for celebrities and invited authorities, has a capacity for more than 200 people. It is often the scene of numerous artistic performances as the National Festival of Ballet. is located in block 7 of jirón Bolívar.

Museums and exhibition halls
 Toy Museum
Located a few blocks from the Plaza de Armas is with its coffee bar owned by the painter Gerardo Chávez, here it can find toys dating from the mid-20th century. It is located in the block of Jirón Independencia in one corner of the intersection with the Jirón Junín.
 Museum of Casa de la Emancipación
Set on the corner of Jirón Gamarra with Jirón Pizarro, is a traditional cultural center for excellence in Trujillo, here are art exhibitions and special ceremonies are performed in the central patio. It is housed in a restored mansion that was the scene of gestation of Independence of Trujillo by Torre Tagle in 1820, and is now owned by Banco Continental.
 Museum of the College of Architects of La Libertad
Another place that provide very culture is the College of Architects of La Libertad, located in the historic centre, the rooms of the seat of the school presented artwork by different authors, from time to time is changed the exposition with a new one.
 Museum of Zoology
Administered by the National University of Trujillo, the Museum of Zoology is one of the oldest in the city, it shows an interesting display of varied taxidermic fauna of the coast, highlands and jungle of Peru, each year the museum is one of the most visited in Trujillo, entrance fees vary for schools, universities and tourists. It is located in block 3 of the jirón San Martín.
 Museum of Archaeology, Anthropology and History
Administered by the National University of Trujillo, the museum is mainly intended to show through seven rooms the historical process development on the north coast and particularly in the coastal valleys of La Libertad Region, since the arrival of the first inhabitants, 12,000 years ago, until the arrival of European conquistadors in 1532. Has been placed special emphasis on establishing a harmonious relationship between the museum and the existing architecture of the house, resulting in the design and distribution of exhibition modules, lighting systems, among others. Since 1939 the museum is giving the public the best shows of our local and national history, currently housed in the Casona Risco, on Jirón Junín 682.

 Cultural Centre Víctor Raúl Haya de la Torre, opened on July 12, 2010, it may be five rooms devoted to Peruvian 20th century's most influential political philosopher and the only South American creator of a continental level ideology. In these first five rooms also reviews the cultural life of the city of Trujillo focusing on major figures of the "Grupo Norte" as were César Vallejo, Antenor Orrego, Ciro Alegría, Macedonio de la Torre, among others, and their heirs, the "Grupo Trilce", among them Julio Garrido Malaver, Eduardo González Viaña and Cristóbal Campana who was at the time in charge of the executive unit No 11 responsible for the upkeep of the citadel of Chan Chan. It can also visit other five rooms with traveling exhibitions dedicated to the arts, today (12/08/2010) on display is a room dedicated to the prestigious painter Gerardo Chávez.
 Cathedral Museum
Administered by the Metropolitan Archbishop of Trujillo, the museum displays all the religious history of the city from colonial times to the present.
 BCR Museum
Administered by the Central Reserve Bank of Peru, located in the mansion Urquiaga, exhibits a unique collection of coins from the beginnings of Peru to the present day, also keeps furniture and household equipment itself of colonial and republican, since from this mansion Simón Bolívar led the government of the country.

Galleries and malls
 Real Plaza El Mercado Central El Virrey Centro Comercial Primavera El Palacio de HierroSites of interest

 Plazuela El Recreo
 Municipal Theatre of Trujillo
 Plazuela Iquitos
 Plazuela San Agustín located in block 5 of the jirón Bolívar against the Church San Agustín.
 Plazuela Bolívar
 Plazuela La Merced, located next to the Church La Merced and the headquarters of the Superior Court of Justice of La Libertad in the Paseo Pizarro, usually stage performances.
 Paseo de las Letras
 Park of the Wall
 The Bastion Herrera and the Former Gate of Miraflores, parts of the old city wall, is the area of the former Bastion of Herrera, the Former Gate of Miraflores, the Jirón and Old Part (19th century) of the Miraflores cemetery. Also includes the adjoining streets to the Bastion (Minería, Gremios and Comercio).
 The City Hall
 The Atrium of the Church San Francisco
 The Atrium of the Church Santo Domingo
 Hospital Belén de Trujillo, founded on May 11, 1551 and is the second oldest hospital in the country. Initially had the name of Hospital Santiago, on land donated by Don Juan de Sandoval, husband of the lady Doña Florencia de Mora. Its main entrance is located in block 3 of the jirón Bolivar and occupies a space in the block composed of streets Bolívar, Bolognesi, Ayacucho and Almagro.
 La Alameda de Mansiche
 The Bullring of Trujillo
 Former railroad station
 Former Gate de la Sierra, part of the old city wall, comprising the blocks 1st. and 2nd. of Jirón Unión from Avenue España; corresponds to the first expansion of the walled city. This area retains some buildings of monumental value.
 Theatre San Juan, located in block 6 of street Independencia, is the scene of many artistic representations.
 Coliseum Inca, located in the intersection of Independencia and Estete streets.

Places of entertainment

Some of the places of entertainment for visitors in the historic centre of Trujillo are:
 Casino Excálibur, in block 6 of Paseo Pizarro.
 El Estribo, touristic peña located in the 8th block of Jirón San Martín.
 Karaoke and casino Solid Gold in block 5 of the jirón Orbegoso.
 Casino Moulin Rouge, located in block 5 of the jirón Orbegoso.
 Casino Royal in the Plaza de Armas of the city.
 Sports complex Mansiche The Bullring of Trujillo''

See also 
 Trujillo
 Plaza de Armas of Trujillo
 Freedom Monument
 Independence of Trujillo
 Moche
 Huanchaco
 Las Delicias beach

References

External links 
 Map of the Historic Centre of Trujillo

Multimedia 
 
 Photo gallery of the Historic Centre of Trujillo by Panoramio includes geographical information from various authors.
 Colonial images of the Historic Centre of Trujillo

Historic districts
Geography of Trujillo, Peru
Colonial Peru
Localities of Trujillo, Peru
Tourist attractions in Trujillo, Peru
1534 establishments in the Spanish Empire